Poiatti SPA, or more simply Poiatti, is an Italian pasta manufacturing company based in Sicily.

History
Domenico Poiatti, born in 1921, in 1940 left Pian D'Artogne for military service. Domenico takes his small family to his native Pian D'Artogne; here he works in his uncle's old water-fed mill that grinds corn and dried chestnuts, but Poiatti returned to Mazara in 1946. Domenico opens a grocery store, then buys a small artisan pasta factory that became the current company.

Production
Poiatti produces 100 forms of pasta with Sicilian wheat, from durum wheat semolina to eggs, from products made from bronze to Couscous. Poiatti S.p.A. has a production plant in Mazara del Vallo on Sicily, with more than 60 employees.

Distribution 
In Italy, the Poiatti pasta is marketed and distributed directly by the company. In the foreign market (Europe, United States, Canada, Australia and Brazil) the distribution is managed by local partners.

References

Italian pasta companies
Italian brands
Companies based in Sicily
Privately held companies of Italy
Italian companies established in 1946